Jack Hatchell Transit Center is a small bus-only station located on 15th Creek Dr. west of Coit in Plano, Texas (U.S.A.). It is owned and operated by Dallas Area Rapid Transit (DART), whose buses mostly serve Plano-area hospitals such as the Presbyterian Hospital and the Medical Center of Plano. It is one of the few DART transit centers outside the Dallas County area.

In 1989 the bus station was opened as the West Plano Transit Center.  On 12 October 2009, DART dignitaries and the City of Plano renamed and formally dedicated the station in memory of a  respected Collin County Commissioner and transportation leader who died in 2008.

References

External links
Dallas Area Rapid Transit - Jack Hatchell Transit Center

Dallas Area Rapid Transit
1989 establishments in Texas
Bus stations in Texas